The Museum of Maritime Science (船の科学館, Fune-no-kagakukan) is a marine science museum located in Higashiyashio, Shinagawa, Tokyo on Odaiba island, Japan. Exhibits include Japanese boats, items related to the navy, shipping industry, fishing, sailing, maritime recreation, ship design and building, and the environment of the seas and oceans around Japan. The museum building itself is modelled after the British ocean liner Queen Elizabeth 2.

Outside the museum building are a number of exhibits including a large screw propeller, Ayumi I-Go Ocean Floor House, Tankai Submarine and PC-18 submersible, a wooden fishing boat from Kujūkuri, Osesaki lighthouse and Anorisaki Lighthouse.

Since May 1979 the icebreaker Sōya has been moored alongside the museum open to the public.

Gallery

See also
List of museums in Tokyo

References

External links

 Museum website 

Shinagawa
Odaiba
Museums in Tokyo
Science museums in Japan
Maritime museums in Japan
Museums established in 1974
1974 establishments in Japan